The 1949 Washington State Cougars football team was an American football team that represented Washington State College during the 1949 college football season. In his fifth and final year as head coach, Phil Sarboe led the team to a 2–6 mark in the Pacific Coast Conference (PCC) and 3–6 overall.

The Cougars' four home games were played on campus in Pullman at Rogers Field, with a nearby road game in Moscow against Palouse neighbor Idaho. Washington State opened with two wins at home but ended the season on a four-game losing streak.

Sarboe resigned after the season in early December, then coached at North Central High School in Spokane. He was succeeded at WSC in late January by 31-year-old Forest Evashevski, the backfield coach at Michigan State under Biggie Munn and a former back at Michigan under Fritz Crisler.

Schedule

References

External links
 Game program: Utah State at WSC – September 17, 1949
 Game program: Montana at WSC – September 24, 1949
 Game program: Oregon at WSC – October 8, 1949
 Game program: UCLA at WSC – October 22, 1949

Washington State
Washington State Cougars football seasons
Washington State Cougars football